The PMW-EX1 is a high definition camcorder made by Sony costing $7,790 MSRP

The Sony EX1 is popular among independent filmmakers due to the 1/2" TrueHD sensors, better depth of field control, and better low light capabilities.

Other comparable class cameras use 1/3" sensors and pixel shifting or other schemes to simulate resolution.

The PMW-EX1 utilizes Sony's three 1/2-inch type "Exmor" CMOS sensors, each with an effective pixel count of 1920 x 1080. Coupled with signal processing LSI, the PMW-EX1 produces images in 1080p (30 and 24 frame/s), 720p (up to 60 frame/s) and 1080i (up to 60 frame/s) HD.

The Sony EX1 records internally to SxS (S by S) cards and does not internally record to tape (an external tape device would be required).   The SxS-1 card was introduced in December 2009 as a more affordable option with a shorter operational life than SxS Pro cards.

Development of the ExpressCard adapters such as MxR, MxM and KxT have allowed for the use of selected consumer-level SDHC cards at standard frame rates and 720p rates up to 42 frame/s.

For 4:2:2 color, an external recording device would be required to be used utilizing the EX1's HD-SDI out.

External recording storage devices include:
PHU-60K 60GB portable XDcam Ex Storage approx 200 mins recording time 

Sony SxS card management strategies for video and film production.

Films that have used the Sony EX1 include:
- District 9
- Public Enemies
- Crank: High Voltage
- The Act of Killing

References

External links Sony Xdcam links 
  Sony Xdcam Ex SxS Training handout 

PMW-EX1
PMW-EX1